Yukon is an unincorporated community in Gilmer County, in the U.S. state of Georgia.

History
A post office called Yukon was established in 1899, and remained in operation until 1916. The community was named after the contemporaneous gold rush in Yukon, Canada.

References

Unincorporated communities in Georgia (U.S. state)
Unincorporated communities in Gilmer County, Georgia